Krzysztof Artur Ciebień (born 1 July 1955 in Lublin, Poland) is a Polish diplomat, ambassador to North Korea (2014–2019).

Life 
Ciebień grew up in Zamość where he finished high school. He started his studies at the Main School of Planning and Statistics in Warsaw and continued them at the Moscow State Institute of International Relations. Finally, in 1981 he graduated from the Faculty of Far East. He has been studying also at the Polish Institute of International Affairs (1985), National School of Public Administration (2007), and Polish Institute of Diplomacy (2014). Besides Polish, he speaks Chinese, English, and Russian.

In October 1981, he began his professional career at the Ministry of Foreign Affairs of Poland (MFA). Following year, he was sent to China, serving at the Consulate General in Shanghai and at the Embassy in Beijing. In 1984, he returned to the MFA, Department of Africa, Asia, Australia and Oceania. Between 1986 and 1990, he was back at the Embassy in Beijing. From 1992 to 1997, he was Consul General in Hong Kong. For the next three years, he was responsible for the relations with Asian states at the MFA. Next, he was deputy ambassador in Bangkok, Thailand (2000–2004) and Beijing (2005–2006). From 2006 to 2009, he was head of East Asia Unit at the MFA Asia-Pacific Department. Between 2009 and 2014, he was holding posts of the Consul General in Guangzhou and, from 13 September 2014 to 31 January 2019, Poland Ambassador to North Korea.

References 

1955 births
Ambassadors of Poland to North Korea
Consuls-General of Poland
Living people
Moscow State Institute of International Relations alumni
People from Lublin